Schizohelea is a genus of flies belonging to the family Ceratopogonidae.

The species of this genus are found in Europe and Northern America.

Species:
 Schizohelea leucopeza (Meigen, 1804)

References

Ceratopogonidae